Portrait is a 1968 Glen Campbell compilation album manufactured for the European market, containing most of his country music hits up to that early point in his career, plus some album and single tracks.

Track listing
Side 1:

 "Hey Little One" (Dorsey Burnette, Barry De Vorzon)- 2:30
 "I Wanna Live"  (J.D. Loudermilk)- 2:42
 "Puff the Magic Dragon" (instrumental) (Peter Yarrow, Leonard Lipton)- 2:24
 "By The Time I Get To Phoenix" (Jimmy Webb)- 2:40
 "Gentle on My Mind" (John Hartford)- 2:55
 "Burning Bridges" (Walter Scott)- 2:28

Side 2:

 "It's Over" (Roy Orbison, Bill Dees)- 2:37
 "I'll Hold You In My Heart" (Arnold, Horton, Dilbeck)- 2:46
 "Green, Green" (instrumental) (Barry McGuire, R. Sparks)- 2:00
 "Dreams of the Everyday Housewife" (Chris Gantry)- 2:31
 "Keli Hoedown" (instrumental) (Glen Campbell)- 1:46
 "Less of Me" (Glen Campbell)- 2:33

1968 compilation albums
Glen Campbell compilation albums
Capitol Records compilation albums